Susan Yanet Bejarano Rodríguez (born 7 August 1995), known as Susan Bejarano, is a Mexican professional football midfielder who currently plays for Guadalajara of the Liga MX Femenil.

In December 2017, Bejarano was honored by the governor of Colima, José Ignacio Peralta.

Honours

Club
Guadalajara
Liga MX Femenil: Apertura 2017

References

External links
 
 Susan Bejarano at C.D. Guadalajara Femenil 

1995 births
Living people
Mexican women's footballers
Footballers from Colima
Liga MX Femenil players
Women's association football midfielders
Mexican footballers